Agneta Andersson (born 1958) is a Swedish Sámi artist and art educator.

She was born in Kiruna and received a MFA in textile art from the University of Gothenburg. She pursued further studies at Umeå University and Luleå University of Technology in art theory and history, project management and various artistic media. She works in sculpture as well as producing two dimensional works in textiles, glass and metal. She has taught art in high school as well as giving workshops and courses in the visual arts field.

Andersson received the 2010 Culture Prize. In 2007, she received a Rubus arcticus grant.

References

External links 
 

1958 births
Living people
Swedish women sculptors
Swedish Sámi people
20th-century Swedish sculptors
20th-century Swedish women artists
21st-century Swedish sculptors
21st-century Swedish women artists
People from Kiruna Municipality
University of Gothenburg alumni
Umeå University alumni
Luleå University of Technology alumni